Nisyrus is a genus of stick insects belonging to the tribe Xeroderini and found in the Pacific Islands.

Species
The Phasmida Species File lists:
 Nisyrus amphibius Stål, 1877
 Nisyrus carlottae (Macgillivray, 1860)
 Nisyrus dipneusticus (Wood-Mason, 1878)
 Nisyrus godeffroyi Redtenbacher, 1908
 Nisyrus spinulosus Stål, 1877 - type species

References

External links

Phasmatidae